Wholesale banking is the provision of services by banks to larger customers or organizations such as mortgage brokers, large corporate clients, mid-sized companies, real estate developers and investors, international trade finance businesses, institutional customers (such as pension funds and government entities/agencies), and services offered to other banks or other financial institutions.

Wholesale finance refers to financial services conducted between financial services companies and institutions such as banks, insurers, fund managers, and stockbrokers.

Modern wholesale banks engage in: 
 Finance wholesaling
 Underwriting
 Market making
 Consultancy
 Mergers and acquisitions
 Fund management

See also 
 Merchant banking
 Retail banking
 Commercial banking
 Investment banking

References

Banking
Banking